The 1965 New York City mayoral election occurred on Tuesday, November 2, 1965, with Republican Congressman John Lindsay winning a close plurality victory over the Democratic candidate, New York City Comptroller Abraham Beame.

Lindsay received 44.99% of the vote to Beame's 40.98%, a victory margin of 4.01%. Finishing in a distant third was the candidate of the recently formed Conservative Party, conservative author and commentator William F. Buckley Jr., who received 13.36% of the vote. Lindsay and Beame received the Liberal and Civil Service ballot line respectively. Lindsay won a decisive majority in Manhattan, while winning comfortable plurality victories in Queens and Staten Island. Beame won pluralities in the Bronx and Brooklyn.

Linsday was sworn into office in January 1966, replacing outgoing Democratic Mayor Robert F. Wagner Jr. While Lindsay won the mayoralty four years later, he lost the Republican nomination to John J. Marchi. As a result, this was the last mayoral election that a Republican won until Rudy Giuliani's victory in 1993.

Results

Almost a quarter of Lindsay's vote (281,796) was on the Liberal Party line, while 63,590 of Beame's votes were on the Civil Service Fusion line. John Lindsay, a Republican Congressman from the Upper East Side of Manhattan, carried Manhattan, Queens, and traditionally Republican Staten Island (Richmond), while Abe Beame, the City Comptroller, carried The Bronx and his home borough of Brooklyn, both of which he had also won in the Democratic primary. However, while Beame had also carried Queens in the primary, he lost it to Lindsay in the general election.  (Five years later, Bill Buckley's brother James L. Buckley won the 1970 New York state election for U.S. Senator on the Conservative Party line against divided opposition.) The Other vote was 11,104- Vito Battista - United Taxpayer Party; 3,977- Clifton DeBerry - Socialist Workers; 2,087 - Eric Haas - Socialist Labor

References

Further reading
 Bridges, Linda, and John R. Coyne Jr. Strictly right: William F. Buckley Jr. and the American conservative movement (2007)
 Cannato, Vincent, J. The Ungovernable City: John Lindsay and His Struggle to Save New York  (2001) pp 19–74 excerpt
 Carter, Barbara. The Road to City Hall: How John V. Lindsay Became Mayor (1967)
 Taffet, Jeffrey F. "The Snubs and the'Sukkah': John Lindsay and Jewish Voters in New York City." American Jewish History 97.4 (2013): 413-438. online
 Viteritti, Joseph P., ed. Summer in the City: John Lindsay, New York, and the American Dream (Johns Hopkins U Press, 2014)

Primary sources
 Buckley Jr, William F. The unmaking of a mayor (1966)

Mayoral election, 1965
1965
New York City mayoral
New York